The 1985–86 Alpha Ethniki was the 50th season of the highest football league of Greece. The season began on 7 September 1985 and ended on 27 April 1986. Panathinaikos won their 14th Greek title.

The point system was: Win: 2 points - Draw: 1 point.

League table

Results

Top scorers

External links
Official Greek FA Site
RSSSF
Greek SuperLeague official Site
SuperLeague Statistics
 

Alpha Ethniki seasons
Greece
1